The official languages of the Republic of Artsakh are Armenian and, since 2021, Russian. Ethnic Armenians make up roughly 95% of the population. There are also minority groups of Russians, Assyrians, Kurds, Jews and Greeks. Prior to the First Nagorno-Karabakh War the former ethnic Azeri population was much higher, with many people being displaced from the area during and after the war thus reducing the percentage of Azeri language speakers in Artsakh.

References

 

Nagorno-Karabakh
Nagorno-Karabakh
Republic of Artsakh culture